Saint Lucy's Day, also called the Feast of Saint Lucy, is a Christian feast day observed on 13 December. The observance commemorates  Lucia of Syracuse, an early-fourth-century virgin martyr under the Diocletianic Persecution, who according to legend brought food and aid to Christians hiding in the Roman catacombs, wearing a candle lit wreath on her head to light her way and leave her hands free to carry as much food as possible. Her feast day, which coincided with the shortest day of the year prior to calendar reforms, is widely celebrated as a festival of light. Falling within the Advent season, Saint Lucy's Day is viewed as a precursor of Christmastide, pointing to the arrival of the Light of Christ in the calendar on Christmas Day.

Saint Lucy's Day is celebrated most widely in Scandinavia and in Italy, with each emphasising a different aspect of her story. In Scandinavia, where Lucy is called Santa/Sankta Lucia, she is represented as a lady in a white dress symbolizing a baptismal robe and a red sash symbolizing the blood of her martyrdom, with a crown or wreath of candles on her head.

In Norway, Denmark, Sweden and Swedish-speaking regions of Finland, as songs are sung, girls dressed as Saint Lucy carry cookies and saffron buns in procession, which symbolizes bringing the Light of Christ into the world's darkness. In both Catholic and Protestant churches, boys participate in the procession as well, playing different roles associated with Christmastide, such as that of Saint Stephen or generic gingerbread men, Santa Clauses, or nisses. The celebration of Saint Lucy's Day is said to help one live the winter days with enough light.

A special devotion to Saint Lucy is practiced in the Italian regions of Lombardy, Emilia-Romagna, Veneto, Friuli Venezia Giulia, Trentino-Alto Adige, in the north of the country, and Sicily, in the south, as well as in the Croatian coastal region of Dalmatia. In Hungary and Croatia, a popular tradition on Saint Lucy's Day involves planting wheat grains that grow to be several centimetres tall by Christmas Day, representing the Nativity of Jesus.

Origins 
An inscription in Syracuse dedicated to Euskia mentioning St Lucy's Day as a local feast dates back to the fourth century A.D., which states "Euskia, the irreproachable, lived a good and pure life for about 25 years, died on my Saint Lucy's feast day, she for whom I cannot find appropriate words of praise: she was a Christian, faithful, perfection itself, full of thankfulness and gratitude". The Feast of Saint Lucy became a universal feast of the Church in the 6th century, commemorating the Christian martyr's death on 13 December 304 A.D. St. Lucy's Day appears in the sacramentary of Gregory, as well as that of Bede, and Christian churches were dedicated to Saint Lucy in Italy as well as in England.

Later, Christian missionaries arrived in Scandinavia to evangelize the local population, carrying the commemoration of Saint Lucy with them, and this "story of a young girl bringing light in the midst of darkness no doubt held great meaning for people who, in the midst of a North Sea December, were longing for the relief of warmth and light". Saint Lucy is one of very few saints still celebrated by the overwhelmingly Lutheran Nordic people  Danes; Swedes; Finns and Norwegians but also in the United States and Canada and Italy. Some of the practices associated with the Feast of Saint Lucy may predate the adoption of Christianity in that region, and like much of Scandinavian folklore and even religiosity, is centered on the annual struggle between light and darkness. The Nordic observation of St. Lucy is first attested in the Middle Ages, and continued after the Protestant Reformation in the 1520s and 1530s, although the modern celebration is only about 200 years old. It is likely that tradition owes its popularity in the Nordic countries to the extreme change in daylight hours between the seasons in this region.

13 December

In Scandinavia (until as late as the mid 18th century) this date was the longest night of the year, coinciding with Winter Solstice, due to the Julian Calendar being employed at that time. The same can be seen in the poem "A Nocturnal upon S. Lucy's Day, Being the Shortest Day" by the English poet John Donne.

While this does not hold for the current Gregorian calendar, a discrepancy of eight days would have been the case in the Julian calendar during the 14th century, resulting in Winter solstice falling on 13 December. With the original adoption of the Gregorian calendar in the 16th century the discrepancy was ten days and had increased to 11 days in the 18th century when Scandinavia adopted the new calendar, with Winter solstice falling on 9 December.

The Winter solstice is not visibly shorter than the several days leading up to and following it and although the actual Julian date of Winter solstice would have been on 15 or 14 December at the time when Christianity was introduced to Scandinavia, 13 December could well have lodged in people's mind as being the shortest day.

The choice of 13 December as Saint Lucy's day, however, predates the eight-day error of the 14th century Julian calendar. This date is attested in the pre-Tridentic Monastic calendar, probably going back to the earliest attestations of her life in the sixth and seventh centuries, and it is the date used throughout Europe. So, while the world changed from a Julian to a Gregorian calendar system—and hence acquired a new date for the Winter Solstice—St Lucy's Day was kept at 13 December, and not moved to the 21.

In the Roman Empire, 25 December (in the Julian Calendar) date was celebrated as being the day when the Sun was born, the birthday of Sol Invictus, as can be seen in the Chronography of 354. This date corresponding to the Winter solstice. Early Christians considered this a likely date for their saviour's nativity, as it was commonly held that the world was created on Spring equinox (thought to fall on 25 March at the time), and that Christ had been conceived on that date, being born nine months later on Winter solstice.

A Swedish source states that the date of (Winter Solstice, St. Lucia, Lucinatta, Lucia-day, Lussi-mass...) i.e. 13 December, predates the Gregorian which implies that "Lucia's Day" was 13 Dec in the Julian Calendar, which is equal to 21 December in the Gregorian, i.e. now. Same source states use of the name "Little Yule" for the day, that it was among the most important days of the year, that it marked the start of Christmas month, and that with the move to the Gregorian calendar (in Sweden 1753) the date (not the celebration) "completely lost its appropriateness/significance".

Saint Lucy 

According to the traditional story, Lucy was born of rich and noble parents about the year 283. Her father was of Roman origin, but died when she was five years old, leaving Lucy and her mother without a protective guardian. Although no sources for her life-story exist other than in hagiographies, St. Lucy, whose name Lucia refers to "light" (Lux, lucis), is known to have been a Sicilian saint who suffered a sad death in Siracusa, Sicily, around AD 310. A devout Christian who had taken a vow of virginity, her mother betrothed her to a pagan. She was seeking help for her mother's long-term illness at the shrine of Saint Agatha when the saint appeared to her in a dream beside the shrine. Saint Agatha told Lucy that the illness would be cured through faith, and Lucy was able to convince her mother to cancel the wedding and donate the dowry to the poor. Enraged, her suitor then reported her to the governor for being a Christian. According to the legend, she was threatened to be taken to a brothel if she did not renounce her Christian beliefs, but they were unable to move her, even with a thousand men and fifty oxen pulling. Instead they stacked materials for a fire around her and set light to it, but she would not stop speaking, insisting that her death would lessen the fear of it for other Christians and bring grief to non-believers. One of the soldiers stuck a spear through her throat to stop these denouncements, but to no effect. Another gouged out her eyes in an attempt to force her into complacency, but her eyes were miraculously restored. Saint Lucy was able to die only when she was given the Christian Last Rites.

In one story, Saint Lucy was working to help Christians hiding in the catacombs during the terror under the Roman Emperor Diocletian, and in order to bring with her as many supplies as possible, she needed to have both hands free. She solved this problem by attaching candles to a wreath on her head.

Saint Lucy is often depicted in art with a palm as the symbol of martyrdom.

Lussi 
Lussinatta, the Lussi Night, was marked in Sweden 13 December. Then Lussi, a female being with evil traits, like a female demon or witch, was said to ride through the air with her followers, called Lussiferda. This itself might be an echo of the myth of the Wild Hunt, called Oskoreia in Scandinavia, found across Northern, Western and Central Europe.

Between Lussi Night and Yule, trolls and evil spirits, in some accounts also the spirits of the dead, were thought to be active outside. It was believed to be particularly dangerous to be out during Lussi Night. According to tradition, children who had done mischief had to take special care, since Lussi could come down through the chimney and take them away, and certain tasks of work in the preparation for Yule had to be finished, or else the Lussi would come to punish the household. The tradition of Lussevaka – to stay awake through the Lussinatt to guard oneself and the household against evil, has found a modern form through throwing parties until daybreak. Another company of spirits was said to come riding through the night around Yule itself, journeying through the air, over land and water.

There is little evidence that the legend itself derives from the folklore of northern Europe, but the similarities in the names ("Lussi" and "Lucia"), and the date of her festival, 13 December, suggest that two separate traditions may have been brought together in the modern-day celebrations in Scandinavia.

Celebration

Italy 
Catholic celebrations take place on 13 December and in May. Saint Lucy or Lucia, whose name comes from the Latin word "lux" meaning light, links with this element and with the days growing longer after the Winter solstice.

St. Lucy is the patron saint of the city of Siracusa (Sicily).  On 13 December a silver statue of St. Lucy containing her relics is paraded through the streets before returning to the Cathedral of Syracuse.  Sicilians recall a legend that holds that a famine ended on her feast day when ships loaded with grain entered the harbor. Here, it is traditional to eat whole grains instead of bread on 13 December. This usually takes the form of cuccìa, a dish of boiled wheat berries often mixed with ricotta and honey, or sometimes served as a savory soup with beans.

St. Lucy is also popular among children in some regions of North-Eastern Italy, namely Trentino, East Lombardy (Bergamo, Brescia, Cremona, Lodi and Mantua), parts of Veneto (Verona), parts of Emilia-Romagna (Piacenza, Parma, Reggio Emilia and Bologna), and all of Friuli, where she is said to bring gifts to good children and coal to bad ones the night between 12 and 13 December. According to tradition, she arrives in the company of a donkey and her escort, Castaldo. Children are asked to leave some coffee for Lucia, a carrot for the donkey and a glass of wine for Castaldo. They must not watch Santa Lucia delivering these gifts, or she will throw ashes in their eyes, temporarily blinding them.

Croatia and Hungary 
In Croatia, Hungary and some their neighbouring countries, a popular tradition on Saint Lucy's Day involves planting wheat grains; nowadays this serves as symbol of the new life born in Bethlehem, with a candle sometimes placed in the middle of the new plant as a symbol of the Light of Christ that Saint Lucia brings. Wheat grains are planted in a round dish or plate of soil, then watered. If the planter is kept moist, the seeds germinate and the shoots are ideally several inches high by Christmas. The new green shoots, reminding us of the new life born in Bethlehem, may be tied with a ribbon and put near or under the Christmas tree. It is in actuality one of the many pagan traditions found in Croatia and other Slavic nations, that once served as part of rituals to appease their many deities and fairies, which were mostly forgotten after their Christianization. Traditions such as this one live on to this day, the deities and original meanings long forgotten, their meanings simply replaced with ones more in accordance with Christianity. The real reason wheat was and is planted at this time, or on the Day of Saint Barbara, is because the density, color and richness of the shoots will foretell how the upcoming yield will be, as well as increase the chances of it being a good one.
In Hungary, a probably pagan tradition says that when you start crafting a chair on this day and do one piece a day, finishing by Christmas eve, standing on the ready made chair the night you will see who is a witch.

Malta 
Santa Luċija is the patron saint of the villages of Mtarfa (Malta) and Santa Luċija, Gozo. On 13 December Malta also celebrates Republic Day.

In the Nordic countries 

In Sweden, Denmark, Norway, and Finland, Lucy (called Lucia) is venerated on 13 December in a ceremony where a girl is elected to portray Lucia. Wearing a white gown with a red sash and a crown of candles on her head, she walks at the head of a procession of women, each holding a candle. The candles symbolize the fire that refused to take St. Lucy's life when she was sentenced to be burned. The women sing a Lucia song while entering the room, to the melody of the traditional Neapolitan song Santa Lucia; the Neapolitan lyrics describe the view from Santa Lucia in Naples, the various Scandinavian lyrics are fashioned for the occasion, describing the light with which Lucia overcomes the darkness. Each Scandinavian country has lyrics in their native tongues. After finishing this song, the procession sings Christmas carols or more songs about Lucia.

Sweden 

The Swedish lyrics to the Neapolitan song Santa Lucia have traditionally been either Natten går tunga fjät (The Night steps heavily) or Sankta Lucia, ljusklara hägring (Saint Lucy, bright mirage). There is also a modern version with simpler lyrics for children: Ute är mörkt och kallt (Outside, it's dark and cold).

Although St. Lucy's Day is not an official holiday in Sweden, it is a popular occasion in Sweden. At many universities, students hold big formal dinner parties since this is the last chance to celebrate together before most students go home to their families for Christmas.

The modern tradition of having public processions in the Swedish cities started in 1927 when a newspaper in Stockholm elected an official Lucy for Stockholm that year. The initiative was then followed around the country through the local press. Today most cities in Sweden appoint a Lucy every year. Schools elect a Lucy and her maids among the students and a national Lucy is elected on national television from regional winners. The regional Lucies will visit shopping malls, old people's homes and churches, singing and handing out gingernut cookies (pepparkakor). Guinness World Records has noted the Lucy procession in Ericsson Globe in Stockholm as the largest in the world, with 1200 participants from Adolf Fredrik's Music School, Stockholms Musikgymnasium and Stockholmläns Blåsarsymfoniker.

Boys take part in the procession, playing different roles associated with Christmas. Some may be dressed in the same kind of white robe, but with a cone-shaped hat decorated with golden stars, called stjärngossar (star boys); some may be dressed up as "tomtenissar" (Santa's elves), carrying lanterns; and some may be dressed up as gingerbread men. They participate in the singing and also have a song or two of their own, usually Staffan Stalledräng, which tells the story about Saint Stephen, the first Christian martyr, caring for his five horses.
Some trace the "re-birth" of the Lucy celebrations in Sweden to the tradition in German Protestant families of having girls dressed as angelic Christ children, handing out Christmas presents. The Swedish variant of this white-dressed Kindchen Jesus, or Christkind, was called Kinken Jes, and started to appear in upper-class families in the 18th century on Christmas Eve with a candle-wreath in her hair, handing out candy and cakes to the children. Another theory claims that the Lucy celebration evolved from old Swedish traditions of “star boys” and white-dressed angels singing Christmas carols at different events during Advent and Christmas. In either case, the current tradition of having a white-dressed woman with candles in her hair appearing on the morning of the Lucy Day started in the area around Vänern in the late 18th century and spread slowly to other parts of the country during the 19th century.

A special baked bun, Lussekatt (St. Lucy Bun), made with saffron and in use as early as November, is a very popular Christmas tradition.

Since 2008 there has been some controversy over males as Lucy, with one male who was elected Lucy at a high school being blocked from performing, and another performing together with a female. In another case a six-year-old boy was not allowed to appear with a Lucy crown because the school said it couldn't guarantee his safety. Conflicts over children of color portraying Saint Lucy have also become prevalent, such as when a company posted an advertisement in 2016 where a dark-skinned Swedish child portrayed Saint Lucy.

Finland
The Finnish celebrations have been historically tied to Swedish culture and the Swedish-speaking Finns. They observe "Luciadagen" a week before the Winter Solstice. St Lucy is celebrated as a "beacon of brightness" in the darkest time of year. The first records of St. Lucy celebrations in Finland are from 1898, and the first large celebrations came in 1930, a couple of years after the popularization of the celebrations in Sweden. The St. Lucy of Finland has been elected since 1949 and she is crowned in the Helsinki Cathedral. Local St. Lucies are elected in almost every place where there is a Swedish populace in Finland. The Finnish-speaking population has also lately begun to embrace the celebrations.

Denmark 

In Denmark, the Day of Lucy (Luciadag) was first celebrated on 13 December 1944. The tradition was directly imported from Sweden by initiative of Franz Wend, secretary of Föreningen Norden, as an attempt "to bring light in a time of darkness". Implicitly it was meant as a passive protest against German occupation during the Second World War but it has been a tradition ever since.

Although the tradition is imported from Sweden, it differs somewhat in that the church celebration has always been strongly centered on Christianity and it is a yearly local event in most churches in conjunction with Christmas. Schools and kindergartens also use the occasion to mark the event as a special day for children on one of the final days before the Christmas holidays, but it does not have much impact anywhere else in society.

There are also a number of additional historical traditions connected with the celebration, which are not widely observed. The night before candles are lit and all electrical lights are turned off, and on the Sunday closest to 13 December Danes traditionally attend church.

The traditional Danish version of the Neapolitan song is not especially Christian in nature, the only Christian concept being "Sankta Lucia". Excerpt: "Nu bæres lyset frem | stolt på din krone. | Rundt om i hus og hjem | sangen skal tone." ("The light's carried forward | proudly on your crown. | Around in house and home | The song shall sound now.")

The Christian version used in churches is Sankta Lucia from 1982, by priest Holger Lissner.

Saint Lucy's Day is celebrated also in the Faroe Islands.

Norway 

Historically Norwegians considered what they called Lussinatten the longest night of the year and no work was to be done. From that night until Christmas, spirits, gnomes and trolls roamed the earth. Lussi, a feared enchantress, punished anyone who dared work. Legend also has it that farm animals talked to each other on Lussinatten, and that they were given additional feed on this longest night of the year. The Lussinatt, the night of 13 December, was largely forgotten in Norway at the beginning of the 20th century, though still remembered as an ominous night, and also celebrated in some areas, especially in Mid, Central and Eastern inland.

It was not until after World War II that the modern celebration of Lucia in Norway became adopted on a larger scale. It is now again observed all over the country.

Like the Swedish tradition, and unlike the Danish, Lucy is largely a secular event in Norway, and is observed in kindergartens and schools (often through secondary level).
However, it has in recent years also been incorporated in the Advent liturgy in the Church of Norway. The boys are often incorporated in the procession, staging as magi with tall hats and star-staffs. Occasionally, anthems of Saint Stephen are taken in on behalf of the boys.

For the traditional observance of the day, school children form processions through the hallways of the school building carrying candles, and hand out lussekatt buns. While rarely observed at home, parents often take time off work to watch these school processions in the morning, and if their child should be chosen to be Lucia, it is considered a great honor. Later on in the day, the procession usually visits local retirement homes, hospitals, and nursing homes.

The traditional Norwegian version of the Neapolitan song is, just like the Danish, not especially Christian in nature, the only Christian concept being "Sankta Lucia". Excerpt: "Svart senker natten seg / i stall og stue. / Solen har gått sin vei / skyggene truer." ("Darkly the night descends / in stable and cottage. / The sun has gone away / the shadows loom.")

Estonia 
In Estonia Saint Lucia Day (Luutsinapäev in Estonian) was traditionally celebrated by the local Estonian Swedes. It is also celebrated annually in the Gustav Adolf Grammar School, which was founded by Swedish king Gustavus Adolphus in 1631, making it one of the oldest extant secondary schools in Europe.

Saint Lucia (Caribbean)
In Saint Lucia, a small island nation in the Caribbean named after its patron saint, St. Lucy, 13 December is celebrated as National Day. The National Festival of Lights and Renewal is held the night before the holiday, in honour of St. Lucy of Syracuse the saint of light. In this celebration, decorative lights (mostly bearing a Christmas theme) are lit in the capital city of Castries; artisans present decorated lanterns for competition; and the official activities end with a fireworks display. In the past, a jour ouvert celebration has continued into the sunrise of 13 December.

Spain
The town of Mollerussa since 1963 holds a contest of paper clothing around this day. 
Saint Lucy is considered the patron saint of dressmakers, who showed their talent making elaborate dresses out of paper.

United States 

The celebration of St. Lucy's Day is popular among Scandinavian Americans, and is practiced in many different contexts, including (but not limited to) parties, at home, in churches, and through organizations across the country. Continuing to uphold this ritual helps people keep ties with the Scandinavian countries.

In the Evangelical Lutheran Church in America (ELCA), which is the successor denomination to hundreds of Scandinavian and German Lutheran congregations, St. Lucy is treated as a commemoration on 13 December, in which red vestments are worn. Usually, the Sunday in Advent closest to 13 December is set aside for St. Lucy, in which the traditional Scandinavian procession is observed.

The public St. Lucy celebration in Lindsborg, Kansas is a way to display the town's Swedish heritage, and serves as a rallying point for the community. It also brings visitors to the town, which benefits the town financially.

Since 1979, Hutto, Texas, has held a St. Lucy celebration for their town at the Lutheran church. Every year a Lucy is picked from the congregation. The procession then walks around the church, sings the traditional St. Lucy song, and serves the traditional saffron buns and ginger cookies.

Gustavus Adolphus College, as a school founded by Swedish immigrants, has celebrated the Festival of Saint Lucy annually since 1941. Six sophomore women are chosen to be a part of the Court of St. Lucy.  The women are chosen by their peers honoring the qualities of the legendary Lucy. In an effort to keep the tradition relevant to today, the selection process changed in 2011 to be more based upon qualities of the legendary Lucy that can be universally celebrated. The selection of the court and Lucy is a two step process.  First, the campus community is invited to submit nominations of any sophomore woman who exemplifies the qualities of courageous leadership, service to others, strength of character, and compassion and therefore is a light to others. These women do not have to have a Swedish connection or the ability to sing (since the court goes caroling in the early morning). Sophomore women then vote who should be on the court. The highest three nominees are included. Then the Guild of St. Lucy, a senior honors society, reviews the remaining nominations and selects up to three more women to serve on the court with the goal of having the court be representative of the sophomore class.

Venezuela
The town of Mucuchíes in Mérida state, Venezuela, has chosen as their patron saints St. Lucy and St. Benedict the Moor. Patron saint festivities are held during the month of December.

Notes

References
 Eriksson, Stig A. (2002). Christmas traditions and performance rituals:  a look at Christmas celebrations in a Nordic context. 2002. Applied Theater Researcher. No. 3. 6/3
 Nygaard, J. (1992). Teatrets historie i Europa ("~ History in Europe"). Volume 1. Oslo: Spillerom.
 NRK radio (2002). Språkteigen. NRK radio. December 2002.

External links

 Nordisk Familjebok, article Lucia Nordisk Familjebok, 1912 
 "A Nocturnal upon Saint Lucy's Day," poem by John Donne (1572–1631)

December observances
Lucy
Lutheran liturgy and worship
Advent
Christmas-linked holidays
Christmas in Sweden
Christmas in Finland
Swedish culture
Danish culture
Norwegian culture
Finnish culture
Italian culture
Diocletianic Persecution